Events from 2020 in Cocos (Keeling) Islands.

Incumbents 

 Administrative head: Barry Haase
 Leaders of the Shire Council: Aindil Minkom

Events 
Ongoing – COVID-19 pandemic in Oceania

 3 February – A US$184 million contract is awarded by the government to renovate and repair the territory's runway.

Deaths

References 

Cocos (Keeling) Islands